The 1948 season was the Hawthorn Football Club's 24th season in the Victorian Football League and 47th overall.

Fixture

Premiership Season

Ladder

References

Hawthorn Football Club seasons